The Thailand men's national tennis team represents Thailand in Davis Cup tennis competition and are governed by the Lawn Tennis Association of Thailand.

Thailand currently compete in the Asia/Oceania Zone of Group II.  They have never competed in the World Group, but reached the Play-offs on four occasions.

History
Thailand competed in its first Davis Cup in 1958.

Current team (2022) 

 Kasidit Samrej
 Yuttana Charoenphon
 Thantub Suksumrarn
 Wishaya Trongcharoenchaikul
 Pruchya Isaro

See also
Davis Cup
Thailand Fed Cup team

External links

Davis Cup teams
Davis Cup
Davis Cup
1958 establishments in Thailand